Barypus is a genus of beetles in the family Carabidae, containing the following species:

 Barypus aequicostis Chaudoir, 1876
 Barypus bonvouloiri Chaudoir, 1861
 Barypus calchaquensis Roig-Junent, 1992
 Barypus chubutensis Roig-Junent, 1992
 Barypus clivinoides (Curtis, 1839)
 Barypus comechingoensis Roig-Junent, 1992
 Barypus dentipennis Roig-Junent, 1992
 Barypus deplanatus Roig-Junent & Cicchino, 1989
 Barypus flaccus Roig-Junent & Cicchino, 1989
 Barypus gentilii Roig-Junent, 1992
 Barypus giaii Roig-Junent, 1992
 Barypus longitarsus (Waterhouse, 1841)
 Barypus mendozensis Roig-Junent & Cicchino, 1989
 Barypus minus Roig-Junent, 1992
 Barypus neuquensis Roig-Junent, 1992
 Barypus nevado Roig-Junent, 1992
 Barypus painensis Roig-Junent & Cicchino, 1989
 Barypus parallelus (Guerin-Meneville, 1838)
 Barypus precordillera Roig-Junent, 2008
 Barypus pulchellus Burmeister, 1868
 Barypus rivalis (Germar, 1824)
 Barypus schajovskoii Roig-Junent, 1992
 Barypus speciosus Dejean, 1831
 Barypus sulcatipenis Roig-Junent, 1992

References

Broscini
Carabidae genera